Robert Cecil (died August 1657) was an English politician who sat in the House of Commons  from 1640 to 1653.

Cecil was the son of William Cecil, 2nd Earl of Salisbury. He was admitted at St John's College, Cambridge in October 1634.

In November 1640, Cecil was elected Member of Parliament for Old Sarum in the Long Parliament. Though not excluded in 1648 he was not recorded as sitting after Pride's Purge.

References

Year of birth missing
1657 deaths
English MPs 1640–1648